Maung Bein, known by honorific U Bein, was a Burmese court official and clerk of Amarapura Mayor Bhai Saab. He is remembered for building the U Bein Bridge. The bridge was built from wood reclaimed from the former royal palace in Inwa. He also served the King Pagan along with Bhai Saab in the closest proximity of all government officials and often enjoyed great power that was derived from the king's favor. Maung Bein and Bhai Saab are some examples of powerful figures who were the most powerful officials of their time. Being favourites of the king, no one can compete with them for power. They are notorious for persecuting the people. Eventually the King Pagan realized their sins and order to executed them. Maung Bein was a Muslim but a graduate of a Burmese monastery.

References

Government ministers of Myanmar